Lay Par Kyawt Shein Warazain is a 2019 Burmese drama film, directed by Thar Nyi starring Min Maw Kun, Htun Htun, Nay Min, Min Thway, Si Phyo, Paing Phyo Thu, Shwe Thamee and Than Thar Moe Theint. The film, produced by Arr Mhan Film Production premiered in Myanmar on January 25, 2019.

Cast
Min Maw Kun as Kyet Pha Gyi.
Htun Htun as Wai Warr.
Min Thway as San Shay.
Si Phyo as Pwal Sar.
Paing Phyo Thu as La Yaung Phway.
Shwe Thamee as Nay Chi Phyar.
Nay Min as Thurain.
Than Thar Moe Theint as Than Thar.

References

2019 films
2010s Burmese-language films
Films shot in Myanmar
2019 drama films
Burmese drama films